Harmogenanina implicata is a species of air-breathing land snail or semislug, terrestrial pulmonate gastropod mollusk in the family Helicarionidae.

This species is endemic to Mauritius.

References

Harmogenanina
Gastropods described in 1870
Taxonomy articles created by Polbot
Endemic fauna of Mauritius